Consulates were operating in Australian cities long before the Commonwealth of Australia was founded in 1901.  The United States opened a consulate in Sydney in 1836, with other countries later following including Switzerland (1855), Germany (1879) and Japan (1896, in Townsville).

The diplomatic corps was first established in Canberra in 1936 when the United Kingdom appointed its first High Commissioner to Australia. Canada appointed a representative in 1939 and the United States of America established a legation in 1940.  This was followed in early 1941 by Japan  only for the legation to be closed in December 1941 with the entry of Japan into World War II.  The period 1941-1945 saw additional legations opened by wartime allies China, the Union of Soviet Socialist Republics, France and the Netherlands and the appointment of High Commissioners by New Zealand and India. In 1946, Australia and the United States upgraded their diplomatic relations to ambassadorial level and exchanged ambassadors in September of that year. This was followed for the other non-Commonwealth permanent members of the UN Security Council, France, China and the Union of Soviet Socialist Republics in 1948  and by the late 1960s all existing legations in Canberra had been upgraded to embassies.

Initially residences and chanceries were in the Canberra suburbs of Red Hill and Forrest.  The majority of missions are today in the lakeside suburb of Yarralumla or the suburb of O'Malley in the Woden Valley.  Many countries have built their chanceries in distinctive architectural styles reflecting national traditions or aspirations.

Some countries have chosen not to establish an embassy in Canberra but instead operate a consulate in a major city, such as Melbourne.

As of December 2022, Canberra hosts 112 embassies/high commissions.

Diplomatic missions in Canberra

Embassies/High Commissions

Other delegations or representative offices 
 (Delegation)
 (Delegation)
 (Taipei Economic and Cultural Office in Australia)
 (Information Centre)

Gallery

Consular missions

New South Wales 

List of diplomatic missions in New South Wales as of 2023 (Department of Foreign Affairs and Trade)

Northern Territory

Queensland 

List of diplomatic missions in Queensland as of 2023 (Department of Foreign Affairs and Trade)

South Australia

Victoria

Western Australia

Non-resident embassies and high commissions 
Resident in Tokyo unless otherwise listed

 (Singapore)
 (Ottawa)
 (Jakarta)
 

 (Ottawa)

 (Pretoria)
 (Beijing)
 (Beijing)

 (London)
 (Beijing)
 (Beijing)
 (Kuala Lumpur)
 (Riyadh)

 (Beijing)
 (Ottawa)

 (Reykjavik)

 (Singapore)

 (Kuala Lumpur)
 (Port Louis)

 (Colombo)

 (Suva)
 
 (Monte Carlo)
 (Podgorica)
 (Kuala Lumpur)

 (New Delhi)
 (Jakarta)

 (Singapore)
 (Beijing)

 (New Delhi)
 (Jakarta)
 
 
 
 (Jakarta)

 (Singapore)
 (Jakarta)

Other delegations or representative offices

Sydney
 (Representative Office)

Closed missions

See also
Foreign relations of Australia
Visa requirements for Australian citizens

References

External links

 Diplomatic List

 
Diplomatic missions
Australia